The 2019 Barrow-in-Furness Borough Council election took place on 2 May 2019 to elect members of Barrow-in-Furness Borough Council in England. This was on the same day as other local elections.

The Labour Party held their control of the council, even though their majority decreased to 12.

Results Summary

Ward Results

Barrow Island

Central

Dalton North

Dalton South

Hawcoat

Hindpool

Newbarns

Ormsgill

Parkside

Risedale

Roosecote

Walney North

Walney South

References 

Barrow-in-Furness Borough Council elections